Proloy Asche (storm approaching) was an Indian Bengali language action thriller  television show and produced and directed by Raj Chakraborty. This 50-day mini series had an ensemble cast consisting of Abir Chatterjee ,  Paran Bandopadhyay and Sayani Ghosh in lead roles. The show aired at  9.30pm from Monday to Friday on Sananda TV.

Plot summary
It is based on a contemporary subject, which has a social and political angle to it. It is about Proloy, a common man, who is not visible to anyone. He protests against injustice and evil.

Cast
Abir Chatterjee
Paran Bandopadhyay
Abhimanyu Mukherjee
Kharaj Mukherjee
Saayoni Ghosh 
Supriyo Dutt
Shankar Chakraborty
Padmanabha Dasgupta

Development
Raj Chakraborty clarified the series would wake-up call for people who are too scared to speak up against injustice. The series have been shot on a Red camera, not like a TV series.
Popular actor Abir Chatterjee have been roped to play a tough-talking cop who’s also easy on the eye! Veteran actor Paran Banerjee, story-writer Abhimanyu Mukherjee and Sayani Ghosh have been roped to enact supporting roles. Supriyo Dutt have been signed to portray the role of the antagonist.

References

External links
 

Bengali-language television programming in India
Indian crime television series
Indian television series